Whiteface Mountain is the fifth-highest mountain in the U.S. state of New York, and one of the High Peaks of the Adirondack Mountains. Unique among the High Peaks, Whiteface features a developed summit and seasonal accessibility by motor vehicle.

Conceived and initiated prior to the Great Depression, Whiteface Castle and the Whiteface Mountain Veterans Memorial Highway were funded entirely by the state of New York, though the timing of the project led to a widespread belief that they were Depression-era public works projects arising from the New Deal. Construction on the toll road began in 1929, after passage of a necessary amendment to the state constitution, with a groundbreaking ceremony featuring then-New York State Governor Franklin D. Roosevelt. Officially opened July 20, 1935, in a ceremony featuring Roosevelt, by then President, the highway was dedicated to veterans of the Great War. The Highway is usually open to vehicles from May to October.

Whiteface Castle, built with granite excavated during the road construction, dominates the summit area. From the adjacent parking lot there are two routes to the summit proper. At the end of the tunnel is an elevator, which rises , approximately 27 stories, to the summit.

Whiteface Mountain Ski Area 

Whiteface was part of the post-World War II growth in recreational skiing attributed to the efforts of returning veterans of the U.S. Army's 10th Mountain Division. It is a major ski area, run by the Olympic Regional Development Authority. Known for its big-mountain skiing, Whiteface is consistently ranked as one of the top ski resorts in the Northeast. It was a prime venue of the 1980 Winter Olympics, hosting all six of the alpine ski events. Whiteface regularly hosts major alpine ski events, such as the US Alpine Skiing Championships, most recently in 2010, and is a U.S. Olympic Training Site.

Whiteface's ski area boasts 90 trails stretching over 25 miles and encompassing three peaks. The Slides is an unmaintained wilderness area that is rarely open due to safety hazards. They can only be accessed by hiking from the top of the Summit Quad. Whiteface has a separate area for beginners known as Bear Den Mountain (formerly Kids Kampus).

In recent years there have been major improvements in snowmaking and grooming. Whiteface contains 90 trails accessible by one gondola, nine chairlifts, and one conveyor lift. Some 98% of the trails are covered by snowmaking, excluding the glades and the Slides. The Slides are double-black diamond runs that are usually only open at the end of the skiing season due to avalanche danger. The Slides are considered to be one of the most challenging ski slopes that are marked on a trail map in the Northeast.

In summer, Whiteface Mountain offers gondola rides and mountain biking.

History
In July 1909, a fire lookout was established on the mountain, but no tower was built due to unobstructed views due to lack of tree cover. The original lookout was a pole frame structure with a canvas tent stretched over it for the observer to get out of the weather. The shelter was later improved to a stone hut. In 1919, a  steel Aermotor tower was built on the mountain. In 1930, along with the construction of the memorial highway, a  memorial tower with a  revolving light to honor the Veterans of the World War. It was later proposed through legislative process, that the tower be built of stone and be . The legislation was vetoed by Governor Lehman. After the completion of the memorial highway, a dispute arose over whether the Conservation Department or the State Highway Department would have control over the fire lookout tower. In June 1935, Governor Lehman intervened and ruled in favor of the Conservation Department. In 1937, the state completed the improvements on the mountaintop which included the Summit House along with the tunnel and elevator. Due to increased use of aerial fire detection, the tower was closed at the end of the 1970 fire lookout season. On May 23, 1972, the fire tower was removed and was one of the first of many towers to be removed from Adirondack Mountains. New York State Forest Rangers and Operations personnel dismantled the tower and marked the pieces for possible future use. The tower's historical sign remained on the mountain for an additional year. The sign was then removed and donated along with the tower to the Adirondack Museum at Blue Mountain Lake.

Climate
Whiteface Mountain has a subarctic climate (Dfc) according to the Köppen climate classification, with severely cold, snowy winters and cool to mild wet summers. The average snowfall at Whiteface Mountain averages 190 inches per year plus 99% of the mountain trails are serviced by snowmaking. During the 2016-2017 season Whiteface boasted a record-breaking 281 inches of natural snowfall.

Gallery

References

External links

 Whiteface Mountain website
 Wilmington Historical Society Photos
 
 Peakbagger.com: Whiteface Mountain
 Summitpost.org: Whiteface Mountain
 The History of Whiteface Mountain Ski Center

Venues of the 1980 Winter Olympics
Olympic alpine skiing venues
Mountains of Essex County, New York
Adirondack High Peaks
Ski areas and resorts in New York (state)
Tourist attractions in Essex County, New York
Mountains of New York (state)